Enrique Hernandez Jr. (born November 2, 1955) is an American lawyer and business executive. He is president and chief executive officer (CEO) of Inter-Con Security Systems, Inc., and a director of Wells Fargo & Company. He has been the non-executive chairman of McDonald's since May 2016, and a director since 1996.

Early life 
A native of Los Angeles, Hernandez graduated from Loyola High School in 1973. He received his BA degree in government and economics from Harvard University in 1977 and was recognized as a Harvard National Scholar. He received his JD degree from Harvard Law School in 1980.

Career
He began to practice law with Brobeck, Pfleger and Harrison in Los Angeles in 1980.

Hernandez left Brobeck, Pfleger, and Harrison in 1984 to join his father at Inter-Con, which the elder Hernandez had founded after a career as Chief of the Los Angeles Police Department. His first position with Inter-Con, in 1984, was in the capacity of executive vice president and assistant general counsel. In 1986 he was elected president and chief executive officer. Under his leadership, Inter-Con has grown to be one of the largest security system providers worldwide, with 25,000 employees in North and South America, Europe, and Africa.

In 1993, Mayor Richard Riordan appointed Hernandez to the Los Angeles Police Commission, where he served as president through 1995.

He was elected a director of McDonald's Corporation in 1996, Nordstrom, Inc., in 1997, and Wells Fargo & Company in 2003. Hernandez was also a director of the Tribune Company from 2001 to 2007. He was elected chairman of Nordstrom in 2006. He is also chairman of the board of regents of Loyola High School, vice chairman of the Los Angeles County Museum of Art, vice chairman of the Children's Hospital Los Angeles Board of Trustees, a director of the California Health Care Foundation, a trustee of the University of Notre Dame and of Pomona College, and a member of the National Infrastructure Advisory Council, Harvard College Visiting Committee, and the Harvard University Resources Committee.

Personal life 
On June 12, 1982, he married Megan Beth McLeod. The couple are the parents of five children. He is of Mexican-American descent.

In the political realm, he supported Richard Riordan's bid to become Governor of the State of California in 2002.

References 

1955 births
Living people
Wells Fargo employees
Harvard Law School alumni
University of Notre Dame fellows
Businesspeople from Los Angeles
Pomona College trustees
McDonald's people
Directors of Chevron Corporation
American people of Mexican descent